Right at Home In Home Care and Assistance is an international franchise system providing in-home care through independent, locally owned and operated Right at Home franchisee offices.  Based in Omaha, Nebraska, it focuses on caring for the elderly and those with Dementia, Alzheimer's Disease, Parkinson's Disease, and hospital recovery. Right at Home serves more than 400 locations worldwide.

Company history 
Right at Home was founded in 1995 by Allen Hager in Nebraska.  Hager was a hospital administrator who says that he repeatedly witnessed patients returning to the hospital after being discharged. He believed that patients were not getting adequate care once they returned home. According to Hager, the company’s first client was a retired farmer who wanted someone to drive him around in a 1958 Chevy truck. Hager was able to locate a qualified caregiver who could also drive an old-fashioned, manual transmission vehicle and that launched the company. In 2000 the company began opening franchise offices in the United States. Hager now serves as the executive chairman, and Margaret Haynes is the current CEO.

International 
Right at Home International In Home Care and Assistance began international franchising in 2009 with Master Franchisees in the United Kingdom and Brazil. Master Franchisees are also located in China (2011), Canada (2012), Ireland (2012), Japan (2013), Australia (2014), and the Netherlands (2014). Right at Home International has more than 50 local offices and, despite instability in the Chinese markets, expects to see an increase in business in China by 2016.

Recognition 
Right at Home has received several industry recognitions. In 2011 The Street ranked it at No. 3 on a list of Successful Senior Care Franchises. A 2014 Forbes article placed Right at Home at No. 2 on a list of “The Best Franchises in America.”  In March 2014 Franchise Times ranked the company as No. 27 on a list of “the smartest growing brands.” An article in Black Enterprise magazine from June 2014 mentions Right at Home as one of the 25 Best Franchises for African-Americans. Right at Home was also placed at No. 199 on the Franchise Times Top 200 in October 2014. Forbes also placed it in the top ten for “Best Franchises list for up to $150,000 investment” in both 2014 and 2015. Right at Home 2014 Caregiver of the Year, Mary Hartsock was honored as The Home Care Association of America, Caregiver of the Year. In March 2015 Franchise Times listed the company as No. 23 on its "Fast and Serious" list of the smartest growing brands. As of 2015 Entrepreneur magazine listed Right at Home as No. 126 on its Franchise 500 list.

Right at Home of the United Kingdom was named The British Franchise Association Emerging Franchisor of the Year Award in 2014. The UK company was also a finalist for the Smith and Henderson Best Franchise award for businesses requiring a £75 thousand or larger investment. 
In 2017 Right at Home UK was awarded "UK Best Franchise Award" for the second successive year having been finalists in 2015 and 2014, and also retained 5-star franchisee satisfaction status in the Smith and Henderson Franchise Satisfaction Benchmark which forms the basis of the award shortlist; for the fifth consecutive year.

By 2018, Right at Home UK's 50th office was officially opened by British Prime Minister Theresa May MP.

Right at Home Ireland was a finalist for the Irish Franchise Awards held in March 2015.

In May 2015 Right at Home was presented with the president's "E" Award. This accolade recognizes contributions to the United States economy through exports and was started in 1961 by President Kennedy.

Philanthropy 
Corporate Philanthropy for Right at Home includes sponsoring of the National Parkinson Foundation Moving Day fundraiser and participating in the ALS Ice Bucket Challenge. COO Margaret Haynes is listed as a contributor on behalf of the company to a fundraiser for Senior Access Marin, a fundraising trip organized by Right at Home Marin Franchise owners. In November 2015, Modesto, Calif. franchise owners, Rick and Diane Carson were recognized for their charitable work with Free Wheelchair Mission.

References 

Companies based in Nebraska